Devaki is an Indian Tamil language film directed by R. S. Mani and released in 1951. The film stars N. N. Kannappa and V. N. Janaki.

Cast
The list is adapted from the song book.

Male cast
N. N. Kannappa as Durai
S. Balachander as Raja
M. N. Nambiar as Gopu
D. Balasubramanyam as Raghunath
T. N. Sivathanu as Secretary
A. Karunanidhi as Govindan
S. M. Thirupathisami as Meiyappar
A. Ganapathi as Kandavel
V. M. Ezhumalai as Doctor
M. N. Krishnan as Student
T. M. Soundar Rajan as Beggar
P. S. Subbaiah as Unemployed Person 

Female cast
V. N. Janaki as Devaki
Madhuri Devi as Leela
R. Bharathi as Pappa
S. R. Janaki as Kunjammal
M. Radha Bai as Student's Association President
M. D. Krishna Bai as Women's Association President
Baby Rani Vasanthi as Selvamani
Dance
Lalitha
Padmini
Ragini
Kumari Kamala

Soundtrack
Music was composed by G. Ramanathan and lyrics were penned by A. Maruthakasi, Ka. Mu. Sheriff and Kannadasan.Singers are S. Balachander, T. M. Soundararajan and Master Subbaiah. Playback singers are Thiruchi Loganathan, N. L. Ganasaraswathi, P. Leela, Jikki, A. G. Rathnamala and U. R. Chandra.

References

1951 films
1950s Tamil-language films
Films with screenplays by M. Karunanidhi
Films scored by G. Ramanathan